Fort Smith is the name of:

Fort Smith, Labrador, Canada, now known as North West River
Fort Smith, Northwest Territories, Canada
Fort Smith, Arkansas, United States
 Fort Smith National Historic Site in Fort Smith, Arkansas
Fort Smith, Montana, United States
Fort Smith, a former Confederate fort in what is now Bossier City, Louisiana